Robert Broughton Bryce, (February 27, 1910 July 30, 1997) was a Canadian civil servant.

Biography

After graduating with engineering degree from the University of Toronto, Bryce undertook graduate studies in economics at University of Cambridge, where he was influenced by the ideas of John Maynard Keynes. In the fall of 1935, he left Britain for Harvard University where, as a graduate student, he introduced Keynesian economics in the United States, with the help of fellow Canadian Lorie Tarshis. According to John Kenneth Galbraith, Joseph Schumpeter "called Keynes Allah and Bryce his Prophet".

Bryce started working for the Department of Finance in 1938, later becoming assistant deputy minister of Finance and Secretary to the Treasury Board. In 1954, he became clerk of the Privy Council and Secretary to the Cabinet. He retired in 1968 as deputy minister of Finance.

Works

He is the author of Maturing in Hard Times: Canada's Department of Finance Through the Great Depression (McGill-Queen's Press, 1986).  His other book, Canada and the Cost of World War II: The International Operations of Canada's Department of Finance, 1939-1947 (McGill-Queen's University Press, 2005), edited by Matthew J. Bellamy, was published after his death.

Bryce was appointed to chair the Royal Commission on Corporate Concentration in May 1975. He resigned due to illness before its completion, and can be considered to be one of the authors of the report.

Honours
In 1968, he was made a Companion of the Order of Canada "for his services to Canada in various important posts of public administration".

He received honorary Doctor of Laws degrees from the University of Manitoba (1961), the University of Saskatchewan (1970), Mount Allison University (1970) and the University of British Columbia (1980).

References

External links
 
 
 
 Robert B. Bryce fonds

1910 births
1997 deaths
Canadian non-fiction writers
Clerks of the Privy Council (Canada)
Companions of the Order of Canada
Fellows of the Royal Society of Canada
Members of the King's Privy Council for Canada
Keynesians
20th-century Canadian economists